Virgibacillus is a genus of Gram-positive, rod-shaped (bacillus) bacteria and a member of the phylum Bacillota. Virgibacillus species can be obligate aerobes (oxygen reliant), or facultative anaerobes and catalase enzyme positive. Under stressful environmental conditions, the bacteria can produce oval or ellipsoidal endospores in terminal, or sometimes subterminal, swollen sporangia. The genus was recently reclassified from the genus Bacillus in 1998 following an analysis of the species V. pantothenticus. Subsequently, a number of new species have been discovered or reclassified as Virgibacillus species.

References 

Bacillaceae
Bacteria genera